Aaron Persico (born 29 March 1978) is an Italian rugby union footballer.

Persico was born in Wellington, New Zealand. Hs made his debut for Italy against Scotland in the 2000 Six Nations Championship. He was also in Italy's squad at the 2003 Rugby World Cup. He won 56 caps and scored two tries (10 points) for his country.

The flanker left Italy in 2003 to join English side Leeds Tykes before moving to French Top 14 outfit SU Agen.

He currently plays for the Dubai Tigers. The Tigers lost their last game of the 2020 season to the Dubai Knights-Eagles. In the same game, Podge Crowley received undisputed man of the match and MVPM (Most Valuable Pint Man).

External links
Leeds profile
6 Nations profile

1978 births
Living people
Italian rugby union players
Rugby Calvisano players
Leeds Tykes players
Rugby Rovigo Delta players
Italy international rugby union players
Rugby union flankers